The Howick Youth Council (HYC) is a youth voice organisation covering the region of the Howick Local Board in Auckland, New Zealand. 

The council runs events in east Auckland, advocates on behalf of youth and facilitates Auckland Council consultation. Operating in the suburbs of Howick, Pakuranga, Botany Downs and Ormiston, the group represents the youth in the population of 140,000 people living in the boundaries of the Howick Local Board.

Structure 
The council has roughly two dozen members, with a chairperson and deputy chair. The council is primarily funded by the Howick Local Board.

History 
The organisation was created by the Howick Local Board shortly following the board's first meeting, after the 2010 supercity amalgamation and formation of Auckland Council, with the group being founded in August 2011.  

The youth council's inaugural meeting was held on 4 August 2011. The organisation was initially coined the "Howick Local Board Youth Council", with its portfolio initially assigned to Local Board member David Collings. The group gave its first deputation to the Howick Local Board on 12 December 2011. Following this, the youth council's work programme consisted of several events including a yearly "Youth Summit". The group has worked in advocating for a youth space in Howick, with a feasibility study commissioned and published in 2017.

In 2018, the council hosted a debate in the 2018 Howick ward councillor by-election. This was produced as part of a series on voter engagement which The New Zealand Herald pegged as "following the lead of [Chloe] Swarbrick". Stuff city hall reporter, Todd Niall, described the debates "as the most engaging campaign meeting I'd attended". A series of videos running on the youth council's Facebook page attained 5500 views. Later in 2019, the youth council advocated for further consultation on a proposed transit route in Pakuranga. The group did not take a position on the issue but presented to the Auckland Council's Governing Body. The youth council later presented to the Auckland Youth Advisory Panel on public transport fares.

The group has helped organise a variety of events including a youth film festival, youth awards, beach clean-up, and charity concert.

See also 
 Youth council

References

External links 
 Official website

Youth empowerment organizations
Youth councils
Local boards of the Auckland Region
Youth organisations based in New Zealand
Organisations based in Auckland
2011 establishments in New Zealand
Youth politics in New Zealand